Jacob Broom (July 25, 1808 – November 28, 1864) was an American Party member of the U.S. House of Representatives from Pennsylvania.

Jacob Broom (who was the son of Delaware congressman James Madison Broom and grandson of Delaware politician Jacob Broom) was born in Baltimore, Maryland.  He moved to Philadelphia with his parents in 1819.  He studied law, was admitted to the bar in 1832 and started practicing in Philadelphia.  He was appointed deputy auditor of the State in 1840, and clerk of the Philadelphia Orphans’ Court from 1848 to 1852.

Campaign for President
In 1852 Broom ran for President of the United States under unusual circumstances for the Native American Party, later known as the American Party and generally known as the Know Nothings. Broom presided over the party's national convention, which nominated Daniel Webster as its presidential candidate.  When Webster died nine days before the election, Broom was hurriedly named as his replacement, with Reynell Coates of New Jersey as his running mate. Broom received 2,566 popular votes (0.08%), finishing a poor fifth behind Webster (6,994 votes, 0.22%), who had also been nominated by the Union Party of Georgia.  Neither Webster nor Broom received any electoral votes.

Congressional service
Broom was elected as a candidate of the American Party to the Thirty-fourth Congress in 1854.  He served as chairman of the House Committee on Revolutionary Pensions during the Thirty-fourth Congress.  He was an unsuccessful candidate for renomination in 1856 and for election to the Thirty-sixth Congress in 1858.  He died in Washington, D.C. in 1864.  Interment in Congressional Cemetery.

Sources

The Political Graveyard
Convention details
Election results
Race details

External links

1808 births
1864 deaths
Politicians from Baltimore
Pennsylvania Know Nothings
Know-Nothing members of the United States House of Representatives from Pennsylvania
Politicians from Philadelphia
Burials at the Congressional Cemetery
19th-century American politicians
Candidates in the 1852 United States presidential election
Members of the United States House of Representatives from Pennsylvania